The human-body model (HBM) is the most commonly used model for characterizing the susceptibility of an electronic device to damage from electrostatic discharge (ESD). The model is a simulation of the discharge which might occur when a human touches an electronic device.

The HBM definition most widely used is the test model defined in the United States military standard, MIL-STD-883, Method 3015.9, Electrostatic Discharge Sensitivity Classification.  This method establishes a simplified equivalent electrical circuit and the necessary test procedures required to model an HBM ESD event.

An internationally widely used standard is JEDEC standard JS-001.

HBM is used primarily for manufacturing environments to quantify an integrated circuit to survive the manufacturing process. A similar standard, IEC 61000-4-2, is used for system level testing and quantifies protection levels for a real world ESD event in an uncontrolled environment.

Model
In both JS-001-2012 and MIL-STD-883H the charged human body is modeled by a 100 pF capacitor and a 1500 ohm discharging resistance. During testing, the capacitor is fully charged to several kilovolts (2 kV, 4 kV, 6 kV and 8 kV are typical standard levels) and then discharged through the resistor connected in series to the device under test.

See also
 Charged-device model
 Transmission-line pulse

References

External links
 Joint Standard JS-001-2012 Final Revision.
 New Joint Standard: ANSI/ESDA/JEDEC JS-001-2011, For Electrostatic Discharge Sensitivity Testing, Human Body Model (HBM) - Component Level
(Wayback Machine copy)
 New Joint Standard JS-001-2011 info.
MIL-SDT-883 overview page, all revisions
 Human Body Model Overview
 On Semiconductor HBM vs IEC61000-4-2 Comparison Overview

Electrical phenomena